Masala bonds are bonds issued outside India but denominated in Indian Rupees, rather than the local currency. Masala is a Hindi (one of the languages spoken in India) word and it means spices. The term was used by the International Finance Corporation (IFC) to evoke the culture and cuisine of India. Unlike dollar bonds, where the borrower takes the currency risk, Masala bond makes the investors bear the risk. The first Masala bond was issued by the World Bank- backed IFC in November 2014 when it raised 1,000 crore bond to fund infrastructure projects in India. Later in August 2015 International Financial Cooperation for the first time issued green masala bonds and raised Rupees 3.15 Billion to be used for private sector investments that address climate change in India.

In July 2016 HDFC raised 3,000 crore rupees from Masala bonds and thereby became the first Indian company to issue masala bonds. In the month of August 2016 public sector unit NTPC issued first corporate green masala bonds worth 2,000 crore rupees.

See also
 Foreign currency denominated bond
 Eurobond
 Dim sum bond
 Samurai bond
 Uridashi bonds

Sources

Bonds in foreign currencies
Rupee
Investment in India